The .400/360 Nitro Express (2-inch) cartridges are a number of very similar, but not interchangeable, centerfire rifle cartridges developed by James Purdey & Sons, William Evans, Westley Richards and Fraser of Edinburgh, all at the beginning of the 20th century.

Design
The .400/360 Nitro Express cartridges are all rimmed, bottlenecked cartridges designed for use in single shot and double rifles. Whilst almost identical in appearance there were slight variations in both the cartridge dimensions, bullet weights and, with the Purdey cartridge, calibre.

As is common with cartridges for double rifles, due to the need to regulate the two barrels to the same point of aim, each .400/360 Nitro Express cartridge was offered in only one loading.

.400/360 Evans

.400/360 Fraser
The .400/360 Fraser fires a  calibre,  bullet.

.400/360 Purdey
These cartridges were usually marked .400/.360P or .400/.360B.

.400/360 Westley Richards
Westley Richards also produced a rimless version of this cartridge, also firing a 314 gr bullet.

9x70mm Mauser
The 9x70mm Mauser can be fired through rifles designed for the .400/360 Westley Richards, although this is rarely satisfactory as these rifles are usually regulated for a different loading.

History
All versions of .400/360 Nitro Express cartridges appeared at the beginning of the 20th century and were initially very popular for use in Africa and India. 
 
The .400/360 Nitro Express cartridges gradually declined in popularity with the increased popularity of the magnum-lengthed Gewehr 98 bolt-action rifles, being supplanted by such cartridges as the .350 Rigby and the .375 H&H Magnum, whilst in European rifles, the 9x70mm Mauser was superseded by the 9.3×74mmR.
 
The .400/360 Purdey and the .400/360 Westley Richards cartridges can still be sourced today by manufacturers such as Kynoch.

Use
All versions of the .400/360 Nitro Express are suitable for use for hunting medium-sized game.

In his African Rifles and Cartridges, John "Pondoro" Taylor wrote that the .400/360 Nitro Express cartridges "all killed game, but failed to satisfy."

See also
 Nitro Express
 List of rifle cartridges
 9 mm rifle cartridges

References

Footnotes

Bibliography
 Barnes, Frank C., Cartridges of the World, 15th ed, Gun Digest Books, Iola, 2016, .
 Cartridgecollector, "400/360 Nitro Express 2 inch", cartridgecollector.net, retrieved 28 April 2017.
 Kynoch, "Big game cartridges", kynochammunition.co.uk, retrieved 28 April 2017.
 Taylor, John, African rifles and cartridges, Sportsman's Vintage Press, 2013, .

External links
 Ammo-One, "400/360 Nitro Express", ammo-one.com , retrieved 28 April 2017.
 Municion, ".400/.360 Purdey.", municion.org , retrieved 28 April 2017.
 Municion, ".400/.360 Westley Richards N.E.", municion.org , retrieved 28 April 2017.

Pistol and rifle cartridges
British firearm cartridges
James Purdey & Sons cartridges
Westley Richards cartridges